Robert of Anjou, known as Robert the Wise (1276 – 20 January 1343), was King of Naples, titular King of Jerusalem and Count of Provence and Forcalquier from 1309 to 1343, the central figure of Italian politics of his time. He was the third son of King Charles II of Naples and Mary of Hungary, and during his father's lifetime he was styled Duke of Calabria (1296–1309).

Biography
Robert was born around 1276, the third son of the future Charles II of Naples (then heir apparent) and his wife Mary of Hungary. His father was the son of the incumbent King of Naples, Charles of Anjou, who had established an Italian realm a decade earlier in 1266. During the Sicilian Vespers directed against his grandfather Charles, Robert was the hostage of Peter III of Aragon, his grandfather's enemy. In 1285, Robert’s grandfather died at Foggia in Italy, leading to his father (then a hostage) becoming King of Naples as Charles II, with Robert's elder brother, Charles Martel of Anjou as heir apparent.

After the death of his elder brother, Charles Martel of Anjou in 1295, Robert, became heir to the crown of Naples, passing over his child-nephew Charles; to obtain the crown of neighbouring Sicily, he married King James of Sicily's sister Yolanda, in exchange for James's renunciation of Sicily. However, the Sicilian barons refused him and elected James' brother, Frederick II. The war continued, and with the Peace of Caltabellotta (1302) Robert and the Angevin dynasty lost Sicily forever, their rule limited to the south of peninsular Italy.

Robert inherited the position of papal champion in Italy; his reign being blessed from the papal enclave within Robert's Provence, by the French Pope Clement V, who made him papal vicar in Romagna and Tuscany, where Robert intervened in the war of factions in Florence, accepted the offered signiory of that city, but had to abandon it due to Clement's opposition.  

The leader of the Guelph party in Italy, Robert opposed the sojourn of Emperor Henry VII in Italy (1311–13) and his occupation of Rome in 1312. After Henry's death, the Guelph reaction  against the Ghibelline leaders in northern Italy, Matteo Visconti and Cangrande della Scala, made it seem for a time that Robert would become the arbiter of Italy. Already ruler of wide possessions in Piedmont, Robert's prestige increased further when in 1313 the pope named him Senator of Rome, and when he became Lord of Genoa (1318–34) and Brescia (1319) and from 1314 onwards held the resounding papal title of imperial vicar of all Italy, during the absence in Italy of the Holy Roman Emperor, vacante imperio.

In 1328 he fought another emperor who had ventured into Italy, Louis IV of Bavaria, and in 1330 forced John of Bohemia to quit northern Italy. Robert's hegemony in Italy was diminished only by the constant menace of Aragonese Sicily.

When the succession to the margraviate of Saluzzo was disputed between Manfred V and his nephew Thomas II in 1336, Robert intervened on behalf of Manfred, for Thomas had married into the Ghibelline Visconti family. Robert advanced on Saluzzo and besieged it. He succeeded in taking it and sacking it, setting the city on fire and imprisoning Thomas, who had to pay a ransom. The whole dramatic incident is recorded by Silvio Pellico. However, when his viceroy Reforza d'Angoult was defeated in the Battle of Gamenario (22 April 1345), Angevin power in Piedmont began to crumble. With his second wife Sancha of Majorca, Robert established the kingdom of Naples as a center of early Renaissance culture and of religious dissent, supporting the Joachimite prophesies of the Spiritual Franciscans.

At Robert's death in 1343, he was succeeded by his 16-year-old granddaughter, Joanna I of Naples, his son Charles having predeceased him in 1328. Joanna was already betrothed to her cousin, the 15-year-old Andrew of Hungary, son of the Angevin king of Hungary, Charles Robert. In his last will and testament Robert explicitly excluded the claims of Andrew of Hungary, clearly mandated that he become prince of Salerno and specified that Joanna alone assume the crown in her own right, to be succeeded by her legitimate offspring. If she were to die without heir, her younger sister Maria, newly named the duchess of Calabria, and her legitimate offspring would inherit the throne. There is no mention in the will that Andrew be crowned king; and this historiographical tradition is largely the result of later historians' accepting without examination the assertions of Hungarian royal propaganda following Andrew's murder at Aversa in 1345. This propaganda, the Hungarian assault on Joanna following the murder of Andrew, and the invasion of the Regno by Louis I of Hungary eventually led to the end of Angevin rule in Naples.

Legacy
King Robert was nicknamed "the peace-maker of Italy" due to the years of significant changes he brought to Naples. The city and nation's economy lay in the hands of Tuscan merchants, who erected superb buildings, monuments and statues that drastically changed King Robert's capital from a dirty seaport to a city of elegance and medieval splendor. Robert commissioned Tino di Camaino to produce a tomb for his son, who should have been his heir, and Giotto painted several works for him. The University of Naples flourished under the patronage of the king dismissed by Dante as a re di sermone, "king of words", attracting students from all parts of Italy. There was virtually no middle class in the South to balance the local interests and centripetal power of the entrenched aristocracy, who retained the feudal independence that had been their bargain with the Angevins' Norman predecessors.

He was remembered by Petrarch and Boccaccio as a cultured man and a generous patron of the arts, "unique among the kings of our day," Boccaccio claimed after Robert's death, "a friend of knowledge and virtue." Petrarch asked to be examined by Robert before being crowned as poet in the Campidoglio in Rome (1341); his Latin epic Africa is dedicated to Robert, though it was not made available to readers until 1397, long after both Petrarch and Robert were dead.

Family
By his first wife, Yolanda, daughter of King Peter III of Aragon, Robert had two sons:
 Charles (1298–1328), Duke of Calabria (1309), Viceroy of Naples (1318), who was the father of Queen Joanna I
 Louis (1301–10)
Robert's second marriage, to Sancia, daughter of King James II of Majorca, was childless. He had the following extramarital children:
 Charles d'Artois, member of the regency council and grand chamberlain for Queen Joanna I, executed for murder of King Andrew
 Maria d'Aquino (Boccaccio's Fiammetta)
 Hélène, Countess of Matia, who fell in love with and married Andrea I Thopia, Count of Matia, without her father's consent. Hélène was possibly due to marry Philip, son of Baldwin II, when this happened. Thopia's emblem contains three lilies separated by a dotted line, indicating an illegitimate child. Andrea and Hélène had Charles (named after his famous grand grandparent), Georges and Helena together. The marriage was not accepted by Robert, therefore he invited the couple to Naples with the pretext of reconciliation where he had them secretly executed at night.

King Robert's last descendant through a legitimate line was Queen Joanna II of Naples.

Ancestry

Other sources
 Coat of arms of the House of Anjou-Sicily

References

Sources

1276 births
1343 deaths
14th-century monarchs of Naples
Capetian House of Anjou
Monarchs of Naples
Claimant Kings of Jerusalem
Princes of Salerno
Counts of Provence
Sons of kings
Burials at the Basilica of Santa Chiara